Eberhard is an old Germanic name meaning the strength or courage of a wild boar.

People

First name
Eberhard of Friuli (815–866), Duke and key figure in the Carolingian Empire
Eberhard of Béthune (died 1212), Flemish grammarian
Eberhard I, Duke of Württemberg (1445–1496)
Eberhard II, Count of Württemberg (after 1315–1392)
Eberhard I, Count of Bonngau (died 937)
Eberhard III, Duke of Franconia (ca 885–939)
Eberhard (Archbishop of Trier) (1010–1066)
Eberhard of Salzburg (died 1164), Bishop of Salzburg and saint
Eberhard Anheuser (1806–1880), Soap and candle maker, co-founder of Anheuser-Busch
Eberhard Weber (* 1940), German jazz musician and composer

Last name
Eberhard family, a prominent Swiss industrialist family (Eberhard & Co.) from Bern whose origin has been traced back to the 10th century
George-Emile Eberhard (1868–1936), founder of Eberhard & Co
George Eberhard, George-Emile's son and heir
Maurice Eberhard, George-Emile's son and heir
Christian August Gottlob Eberhard (1769–1884), a German writer
Dennis Eberhard (1943–2005), an American composer
Fritz Eberhard (1896-1982), German journalist
Hans J. Müller-Eberhard (1927–1998), a molecular immunologist
Hermann Eberhard (1852–1908), a 19th-century German explorer that discovered Giant sloth remains at Cueva del Milodon Natural Monument
Johann Augustus Eberhard (1739–1809), a German theologian
Martin Eberhard (born 1960), co-founder and former CEO of Tesla Motors
Mary Jane West-Eberhard contemporary biologist upon social wasps and phenotypic plasticity
Matthias Eberhard (1815–1876), Roman Catholic Bishop of Trier
Paul Eberhard (1917–1983), Swiss bobsledder
Théodore Eberhard (1812–1874), Luxembourgish architect and politician
Wolfram Eberhard (1909–1989), a sociologist of rural China

Companies
Eberhard's, supermarket chain in Michigan

See also 
 Everard, anglicized version of the name
 Evert, Dutch version of the name
 Eberhardt
 Eberhart (disambiguation)

References

Germanic-language surnames
Surnames from given names